Make Me a Supermodel is an American reality television modeling competition series based on the British reality series of the same name. Following an audition preview on January 2, 2008, the series premiered January 10, 2008 on the cable television network Bravo.

Overview
For Season 1, the bottom three contestants were selected at the end of each episode and viewers of the show determine which of the three contestants will not continue in the competition with the judges picking the winner of the episode; for the final episode, the viewers determined the winner. For Season 2, viewer participation was removed, and all model eliminations and winners were selected by the judges.

The first season was hosted by supermodels Tyson Beckford and Niki Taylor, and judged by fashion casting director Jennifer Starr and model agent Cory Bautista. The second season premiered on March 4, 2009, with Beckford returning as the sole host. Nicole Trunfio replaced Taylor and act as a mentor to the female contestants, while the judging panel will be completely revamped. The show features top photographers such as Roxanne Lowit, Markus Klinko & Indrani, Howard Schatz, and Suza Scalora.

Seasons

Judges

Sponsors

See also

 America's Next Top Model (2003)
 America's Most Smartest Model (2007)

References

External links
 Season 1 Homepage
 Season 2 Homepage

2000s American reality television series
2008 American television series debuts
2009 American television series endings
American television series based on British television series
Bravo (American TV network) original programming
Fashion-themed reality television series
English-language television shows
Modeling-themed reality television series
Television series by Tiger Aspect Productions
Television series by Endemol